Melpomène was a schoolship frigate of the French Navy.

Career 
Melpomène was ordered in August 1883 as a replacement for Résolue, to serve as a gabier schoolship. She departed for her first training cruise on 23 August 1890, sailing to Dakar and calling the Canary Islands and Tenerife on the way, before returning to Brest on 25 May 1891. 

She performed similar cruises in the following years until 1904.

Fate 
In 1904, Melpomène was struck from the Navy lists. She was hulked in Lorient in 1923. On 19 June 1940, she sank at her mooring, and was broken up in 1943.

Legacy 
Melpomène was the subject of a post stamp in 1974.

Notes, citations, and references 
Notes

Citations

Bibliography
  (1870-2006)

Age of Sail frigates of France
Frigates of the French Navy
1890 ships